Cholesterol 24-hydroxylase, also commonly known as cholesterol 24S-hydroxylase, cholesterol 24-monooxygenase, CYP46, or CYP46A1, is an enzyme that catalyzes the conversion of cholesterol to 24S-hydroxycholesterol. It is responsible for the majority of cholesterol turnover in the human central nervous system. The systematic name of this enzyme class is cholesterol,NADPH:oxygen oxidoreductase (24-hydroxylating).

This enzyme is a member of the cytochrome P450 (CYP) superfamily of enzymes. Like many other CYP enzymes that act on cholesterol, cholesterol-24 hydroxylase is a monooxygenase that hydroxylates the side-chain of cholesterol.

Because 24S-hydroxycholesterol is more polar than cholesterol, it can more easily pass the blood–brain barrier to exit the brain and pass into the bloodstream, where it can then travel to the liver to be further degraded. This enzyme has also been found at low quantities in the retina, where it performs the same function to a lesser degree.

Genetic cloning of the encoding gene (CYP46A1) was first accomplished in 1999 and an extensive E. coli expression and purification system was later developed in 2003.

Molecular structure
The enzymatic structure of the human cholesterol-24 hydroxylase was determined via crystallography at the Stanford Synchrotron Radiation Lightsource, and was shown to be a 57kDa (500 residue) monomeric heme-containing protein bound to the endoplasmic reticulum in neurons.

Cholesterol-24 hydroxylase is similar in structure to many other cytochrome P450s, possessing, for example, the conserved stretch of 23 hydrophobic residues in the N-terminus that make up a transmembrane-anchoring domain (residues 3-27).  Even so, the cholesterol-24 hydroxylase C-terminus has a unique proline-rich region of 5 repeated proline residues, a structural motif absent in all other related cytochrome p450 enzymes. While the exact function of these proline residues remain highly speculative, it has been shown that the deletion of this region results in a two-fold decrease in the enzyme’s catalytic efficiency.

Binding of cholesterol results in an enzymatic conformational change and a subsequent induced fit of the active site around the cholesterol molecule, anchoring the hydroxylation site (C-24, C-25) near the catalytic center of the enzyme (5.7Å from the iron core of the heme molecule to allow oxyferryl intermediates to perform the cholesterol hydroxylation). A loop region, known as the B'-C loop, has a series of 5 residues (residues 116-120) unique to cholesterol-24 hydroxylase that contribute to the positioning of the cholesterol molecule within the active site. A single cholesterol molecule takes up the entirety of the active site, with the aliphatic tail of the cholesterol held in place by interactions with the following hydrophobic residues: Phe-121, Val-126, Ile-301, Ala-302, Ala-367, Thr-475. The active site is accessed via a single entrance created by two helices (B' and F) and the β1-sheet.

There are no known allosteric regulatory sites.

Enzyme mechanism

Cholesterol-24 hydroxylase catalyzes the following reaction:

cholesterol + NADPH + H+ + O2  (24S)-24-hydroxycholesterol + NADP+ + H2O

The 4 substrates of this enzyme are cholesterol, NADPH, H+, and O2, and its 3 products are 24S-hydroxycholesterol, NADP+, and H2O.

Like all other cytochrome P450s, cholesterol-24 hydroxylase utilizes an oxyferryl intermediate to hydroxylate cholesterol. The oxyferryl radical takes the hydrogen from carbon-24 to create an alkyl radical intermediate. The cholesterol alkyl radical then combines with the activated oxygen on the heme to create 24S-hydroxycholesterol.

Function
Cholesterol-24 hydroxylase contributes to brain cholesterol homeostasis by hydroxylating cholesterol at carbon-24 to 24S-hydroxycholesterol to allow for elimination of cholesterol from the brain to the liver. Only around 6–7 mg of cholesterol, however, are hydroxylated by this enzyme on a daily basis, suggesting the existence of alternative functions – presently unknown. In vitro experiments have shown that it is also capable of further metabolizing 24S-hydroxycholesterol into 24,25- and 24,27-dihydroxycholesterols.

Cholesterol-24 hydroxylase has a variety of possible substrates, including: elongated steroid chains, cholesterol derivatives, and a variety of drug candidates.  As such, it is also likely that it plays a role in lipid metabolism in the brain beyond cholesterol breakdown. 
Because 24S-hydroxycholesterol (main product of this enzyme) is a major activator of oxysterol liver X receptors (LXR), it is possible that cholesterol-24 hydroxylase may play an indirect regulatory role in the metabolism of lipids in the liver. 24S-hydroxycholesterol also regulates the rate of cholesterol synthesis in the brain, with high levels of 24S-hydroxycholesterol shown to reduce mRNA levels of the following cholesterol synthesis enzymes: HMG CoA reductase, squalene synthase, and FPP synthase.

Clinical significance
Variable expression of cholesterol-24 hydroxylase has been linked to the onset of Alzheimer's disease (AD) in humans. Studies have shown that in AD patients, there is significant decreased expression of cholesterol-24 hydroxylase in neurons. As a result, there is a marked increase of cholesterol in the brain tissue, consistent with the trend observed in AD patients. Neuron degradation in AD has often been attributed to the imbalance in cholesterol homeostasis, and many scientist hypothesize that the lowered expression of cholesterol-24 hydroxylase may be the main cause of this imbalance.
On the other hand, while there is decreased expression in the neurons, there is a contrasting increase of expression in the AD patients' astrocytes, where there is a consequent build-up of the product, 24S-hydroxycholesterol.  Recent studies have shown that the increased levels of 24S-hydroxycholesterol in astrocytes may lead to a loss of glial glutamate transporters (EAAT2) and the consequent loss of the glutamate uptake function in the brain, another common symptom observed in AD patients.

Still, the link between expression levels of cholesterol-24 hydroxylase and Alzheimer's Disease remain disputable. While some studies have shown that polymorphisms in the encoding gene for cholesterol-24 hydroxylase have an established positive correlation with AD onset, other publications did not find such an association. 
Increased expression of cholesterol-24 hydroxylase has also been observed in patients of traumatic brain injury, leading to decreased levels of cholesterol in the plasma membrane. This is hypothesized to be the brain’s typical response to injury.

Cholesterol-24 hydroxylase is easily inhibited by many drugs due to its broad substrate specificity. It has been shown to metabolize Bufuralol, progesterone, Dextromethorphan, methoxyresorufin, cortisol, Diclofenac, Phenacetin, and testosterone. The ability for inhibition by various xenobiotics makes this enzyme a prime candidate for drug therapy for AD or other brain injuries.

References

External links
 
UniProt entry on Cholesterol-24 hydroxylase
HMDB Database entry
RCSB Protein Data Bank Entry
Review on Cholesterol-24 Hydroxylase
Heme hydroxylation mechanism

EC 1.14.13
Genes on human chromosome 14
NADPH-dependent enzymes
46